Bursey is a surname. Notable people with the surname include:

Jack Bursey (1903–1980), polar explorer and U.S. Coast Guard officer
Morley Byron Bursey (1912–2013), Canadian diplomat

See also
Cathy Bursey-Sabourin, Fraser Herald at the Canadian Heraldic Authority in Ottawa, Canada
Mount Bursey, a mountain in Antarctica
Bursey Icefalls, the icefalls off Mount Bursey